The Clarks Ferry Bridge carries U.S. Routes 22 and 322 across the Susquehanna River near Duncannon, Pennsylvania about 20 miles north of Harrisburg, Pennsylvania.  It is a 4 lane expressway standard bridge.  The bridge also provides safe passage for hikers, bikers, and pedestrians using the Appalachian Trail and BicyclePA Route J. It was completed in November 1986 replacing a 1925 concrete arch toll bridge.

History 
The bridge's name is derived from John Clark, a Scottish settler who in 1788 operated a ferry across the river and the next year established a tavern on the West Shore to cater to riders. After John and his oldest son Daniel both passed away in 1800, youngest son Robert inherited and continued to successfully operate the ferry and tavern. It became such a large draw to travelers that the Commonwealth of Pennsylvania decided by the mid 1820's that a permanent bridge should be established.

An earliest covered bridge was at this site, built in 1828. The first Clark's Ferry Bridge was part of the Main Line Pennsylvania Canal built in 1828. Mules walked on a cantilevered walkway outside the structure and towed canal boats across the river. The dam below the bridge was known as Green's Dam and created a calm surface for the canal boats. The covered bridge that stood in this location was considered at the time to be the longest covered bridge in the world at 2088 feet. Following floods, fires, and large volume, it was replaced in 1925 with a two-lane concrete arch bridge. This bridge carried a toll until 1957, and was replaced with the current bridge in 1986.

See also
List of crossings of the Susquehanna River

References

Ferry
Bridges over the Susquehanna River
Bridges completed in 1986
Road bridges in Pennsylvania
U.S. Route 22
U.S. Route 322
Former toll bridges in Pennsylvania
Bridges of the United States Numbered Highway System
1986 establishments in Pennsylvania